Siah Khvor (also Romanized as Sīāh Khvor, Seyāh Khowr, and Siah Khwār; also known as Sīāh Khor, Sīāh Khūz, and Suvār Khār) is a village in Hasanabad Rural District, in the Central District of Eslamabad-e Gharb County, Kermanshah Province, Iran. At the 2006 census, its population was 486, in 106 families.

References 

Populated places in Eslamabad-e Gharb County